Jogorogo is a district (kecamatan) in Ngawi Regency, East Java Province, Indonesia.

Geography 

Jogorogo is part of Mount Lawu main system, which lies in northwest part of its slope.

See also

 Districts of Indonesia
 List of regencies and cities of Indonesia

References

Ngawi Regency
Districts of Ngawi Regency